Nathan Milone (born 18 March 1994) is an Italy international rugby league footballer who plays as a  for the Wentworthville Magpies in the Intrust Super Premiership.

Background
Milone was born in Blacktown, New South Wales, Australia and is of Italian descent. 

He played his junior rugby league for the Toongabbie Tigers and the Dundas Shamrocks, before being signed by the Wests Tigers.

Playing career

Early career
In 2013 and 2014, Milone played for the Wests Tigers' NYC team, captaining the side in 2014.

2015
In 2015, Milone moved on to the Tigers' New South Wales Cup team. In Round 13 of the 2015 NRL season, he made his NRL debut for the Tigers against the Gold Coast Titans.

References

External links

2015 Wests Tigers profile
2017 RLWC profile

1994 births
Living people
Australian rugby league players
Australian people of Italian descent
Italy national rugby league team players
Rugby league centres
Rugby league players from Blacktown
Wests Tigers players
Wests Tigers NSW Cup players